Wetheral is a civil parish in the Carlisle district of Cumbria, England.  It contains 104 buildings that are recorded in the National Heritage List for England.  Of these, eleven are listed at Grade I, the highest of the three grades, five are at Grade II*, the middle grade, and the others are at Grade II, the lowest grade.  The parish is to the east of the city of Carlisle, and it contains the villages of Wetheral, Great Corby, Cumwhinton, Scotby, Warwick-on-Eden, Warwick Bridge, Broadwath, Cotehill, and Aglionby, and the surrounding countryside.

Wetheral Priory was in the parish, but all that remains of it is its gatehouse and a length of wall; both are listed buildings and scheduled monuments.  Another important building in the parish is Corby Castle, initially a tower house and later expanded; this and associated structures are listed.  Most of the other listed buildings are country houses and smaller houses with associated structures, farmhouses and farm buildings.  In addition, the listed buildings include churches and associated structures, medieval cave dwellings, former water mills, public houses, a milestone, bridges and viaducts, railway stations and associated buildings, war memorials, and a school.


Key

Buildings

Notes and references

Notes

Citations

Sources

Lists of listed buildings in Cumbria